Algerian Jewish Sign Language (AJSL), also known as Ghardaia Sign Language, is a moribund village sign language originally of Ghardaïa, Algeria that is now used in Israel and possibly also in France.

The Jewish community of Ghardaïa immigrated to France and Israel during the years 1943 to 1962. However, because deaf Algerian Jews tended to marry deaf Israelis from other backgrounds, they adopted Israeli Sign Language (ISL) as their primary language and AJSL is now used only by older generations.

Little is known about its use in France.

References

External links
JDCC News

Village sign languages
Sign languages of France
Ghardaïa
Languages of Algeria
Jews and Judaism in Algeria
Jewish languages
Endangered sign languages
Sign languages of Israel